Zinedine Hameur-Lain (born May 26, 1986), is an Algerian-French kickboxer, currently signed with Glory. He is the WBC Muaythai World Champion. He has also fought in SUPERKOMBAT.

He was ranked as a top five light heavyweight kickboxer in the world by Combat Press between December 2017 and June 2022. Before that, he was ranked as a top ten light heavyweight by Combat Press from August 2016 to March 2017.

Martial arts career
In 2014 he fought for the King of the Ring 91 kg title against Corentin Jallon. Zinedine lost the fight in the first round, by TKO.

Zinedine fought for the Emperor Chok Dee Championship heavyweight title in 2015, against Bashirou Ndzemafue. He won the fight in the fourth round by TKO.

He made his Glory debut during Glory 26, against Fred Sikking. Hameur-Lain won the fight by a unanimous decision.

He fought Zack Mwekassa in his second Glory fight, and lost the fight by a unanimous decision.

He participated in the 2016 Glory Light Heavyweight Contender Tournament. In the semi finals he defeated Warren Thompson by KO, and in the finals he defeated Ariel Machado by KO as well.

He lost his next fight to Pavel Zhuravlev during Glory 35 by TKO in the first round.

He fought for the WBC Muayhai World Super Cruiserweight against Budimir Bajbić during Emperor Chok Dee. Hameur-Lain won the fight by a first round KO.

Zinedine will compete in the light heavyweight contender tournament at Glory 38. He will face Zack Mwekassa in the tournament semi-finals. He was scheduled to fight Zack Mwekassa in the semi finals, but ;welassa wasn't cleared to fight by the Illinois State Athletic Commission. He was replaced by Brian Collete. Zinedine defeated him with a second round overhand KO. Hemeur-Lain fought Ariel Machado in the finals, but lost the fight in the first round by TKO.

He began a three fight winning streak with a first round KO of Freddy Kemayo. Zinedine then defeated Raffaele Vitale by a decision, and Michael Duut by TKO.

He fought Felipe Micheletti during Felipe's Glory debut. The fight was first scheduled for Glory 57, but was rescheduled for Glory 60, as Zinedine withdrew with an injury. Micheletti won the fight by TKO, after Hemeur-Lain suffered a hip injury.

He fought Artur Gorlov during Glory 64. At the end of the first round, Gorlov landed a heavy blow to Zinedine's groin, with Hameur-Lain being rendered unable to continue the fight. He won by DQ.

Zinedine fought during Emperor Chok Dee XI, facing Adel Zaripov. He won the fight by TKO, managing to knock Zaripov down three times in the first round.

In 2020, Hameur-Lain signed a new three year contract with Glory.

Titles
Professional
2017 Glory Light Heavyweight Contender Tournament Runner-up
2017 WBC Muayhai World Super Cruiserweight 95.454 kg Champion
2016 Glory Light Heavyweight Contender Tournament Winner
2015 Emperor Chok Dee Champion -95 kg
2014 ICO - Japan Kickboxing World Champion -93 kg
2012 Profight Karate Tournament Cruiserweight Champion
2010 Peace Heavyweight Tournament Runner-up
2009 WPMF European Thai Boxing rules Champion
2008 WAKO-Pro European Low-Kick rules Cruiser Heavyweight Champion -94.1 kg
2008 All Star Tournament Champion

Amateur
2005 World Champion
5-time champion of France

Kickboxing record 

|-  bgcolor="#fbb""
| 2022-11-26|| Loss ||align=left| Nikita Kozlov || RCC Fair Fight 19 || Yekaterinburg, Russia || KO (Flying knee) || 2 || 
|-  bgcolor="#fbb""
| 2022-05-21 || Loss ||align=left| Anthony Leroy || Stars Night 2022 || Vitrolles, France || Decision || 3  || 3:00
|-
|-  style="text-align:center; background:#CCFFCC"
| 2020-02-08 || Win||align=left| Adel Zaripov || Emperor Chok Dee XI || Vandœuvre-lès-Nancy, France || TKO (Three knockdowns) || 1 ||
|-
|-  style="text-align:center; background:#CCFFCC"
| 2019-03-09 || Win||align=left| Artur Gorlov || Glory 64: Strasbourg  || Strasbourg, France || DQ (Intentional Foul) || 1 || 4:45
|- style="background:#fbb;"
| 2018-10-20 || Loss ||align=left| Felipe Micheletti || Glory 60: Lyon || France || TKO (Retirement) || 1 || 3:00

|- style="background:#cfc;"
| 2018-05-12 || Win||align=left| Michael Duut || Glory 53: Lille || Lille, France || TKO (Right Hook) || 2 ||  1:14
|- style="background:#cfc;"
| 2018-02-10 || Win ||align=left| Raffaele Vitale || Emperor Chok Dee || Paris, France || Decision  || 3 || 3:00
|-
|- style="background:#cfc;"
| 2017-06-10 || Win ||align=left| Freddy Kemayo || Glory 42: Paris|| Paris, France || KO (right hook and head kick)  || 1 || 2:35
|-
|- style="background:#fbb;"
| 2017-02-24 || Loss ||align=left| Ariel Machado || Glory 38: Chicago, Final || Hoffman Estates, Illinois, USA || TKO (Punches) || 1 || 2:43 
|-
! style=background:white colspan=9 |
|-
|- style="background:#cfc;"
| 2017-02-24 || Win ||align=left| Brian Collete || Glory 38: Chicago, Semi Finals || Hoffman Estates, Illinois, USA || KO (Overhand Right) || 2 ||  2:46
|-
|- style="background:#cfc;"
| 2017-02-04 || Win ||align=left| Budimir Bajbić || Emperor Chok Dee || Vandœuvre-lès-Nancy, France || KO || 1 ||
|-
! style=background:white colspan=9 |
|-
|- style="background:#fbb;"
| 2016-11-05 || Loss ||align=left| Pavel Zhuravlev|| Glory 35: Nice || Nice, France || TKO (Punches) || 1 || 1:58  
|-
|- style="background:#cfc;"
| 2016-07-22 || Win ||align=left| Ariel Machado|| Glory 32: Virginia, Final || Norfolk, Virginia || KO (strikes) || 2 || 1:00
|-
! style=background:white colspan=9 |
|-
|- style="background:#cfc;"
| 2016-07-22 || Win ||align=left| Warren Thompson || Glory 32: Virginia, Semi Finals || Norfolk, Virginia || KO (punch) || 1 || 0:12
|-
|- style="background:#fbb;"
| 2016-04-16 || Loss ||align=left| Zack Mwekassa || Glory 29: Copenhagen || Copenhagen, Denmark || Decision (unanimous) || 3 || 3:00 
|-
|- style="background:#cfc;"
| 2015-12-04 || Win ||align=left| Fred Sikking || Glory 26: Amsterdam || Amsterdam, Netherlands || Decision (unanimous) || 3 || 3:00
|-
|- style="background:#fbb;"
| 2015-08-04 || Loss ||align=left| Frank Muñoz || Fight Night Saint-Tropez  || Saint-Tropez, France || Decision (unanimous) || 4 || 2:00
|- style="background:#fbb;"
| 2015-04-26 || Loss ||align=left| Sergio Pique || King of the Ring 4 || Metz, France || Decision (unanimous) || 3 || 3:00
|- style="background:#cfc;"
| 2015-03-31 || Win ||align=left| Dmitri Fevralev || Tatneft Arena World Cup 2015 4th selection 1/8 final (+91 kg) || Kazan, Russia || TKO (ref. stoppage) || 2 || N/A
|- style="background:#fbb;"
| 2015-03-07 || Loss ||align=left| Bogdan Stoica || SUPERKOMBAT World Grand Prix I 2015 || Ploiești, Romania || KO (overhand right) || 1 || N/A
|- style="background:#cfc;"
| 2015-01-31 || Win ||align=left| Bashirou Ndzemafue || Emperor Chok Dee  || Nancy, France || TKO (strikes) || 4 || N/A
|-
! style="background:white" colspan=9 | 
|- style="background:#fbb;"
| 2014-05-10 || Loss ||align=left| Corentin Jallon || King of the Ring 3  || Metz, France || TKO (strikes) || 1 || N/A
|-
! style="background:white" colspan=9 | 
|- style="background:#c5d2ea;"
| 2014-03 || Draw ||align=left| Aristote Quitusisa || Choc des Titans 12 || France || Decision || 3 || 3:00
|- style="background:#cfc;"
| 2014-02-08 || Win ||align=left| Haris Gredeh || Emperor Chok Dee 6  || Nancy, France || KO (strikes) || 1 || 0:14
|-
! style="background:white" colspan=9 | 
|- style="background:#fbb;"
| 2013-12-23 || Loss || align=left|  Fabian Gondorf || W5 Grand Prix Moscow || Moscow, Russia || TKO (strikes) || N/A || N/A
|- style="background:#fbb;"
| 2013-11-23 || Loss ||align=left| Jérôme Le Banner || La 20ème Nuit des Champions || Marseille, France || KO (right body shot) || 2 || 0:40
|- style="background:#fbb;"
| 2013-08-30 || Loss ||align=left| Andrei Stoica || SUPERKOMBAT New Heroes 5 || Târgoviște, Romania || KO (punch) || 2 || N/A
|- style="background:#cfc;"
| 2013-08-04 || Win||align=left| Marc Vlieger ||Fight Night|| Saint Tropez, France || Decision || 3 || 2:00
|- style="background:#fbb;"
| 2013-04-27 || Loss ||align=left| Ondřej Hutník || Gala Night Thaiboxing || Žilina, Slovakia || KO (round kick) || 1 || N/A
|- style="background:#fbb;"
| 2013-03-09 || Loss ||align=left| Redouan Cairo || Monte Carlo Fighting Masters || Monte Carlo, Monaco || TKO (strikes) || 3 || N/A
|-
! style="background:white" colspan=9 | 
|- style="background:#cfc;"
| 2012-11-20 || Win ||align=left| Bouhanane || A1 World Combat Cup  || Lyon, France || Decision || 3 || 3:00
|- style="background:#fbb;"
| 2012-10-20 || Loss ||align=left| Alexey Ignashov || Tatneft Arena World Cup 2012 Final || Kazan, Russia || Decision (unanimous) || 3 || 3:00
|- style="background:#fbb;"
| 2012-09-19 || Loss ||align=left| Yuksel Ayaydin || Thai Fight: Lyon  || Lyon, France || Decision || 3 || 3:00
|- style="background:#fbb;"
| 2012-07-19 || Loss ||align=left| Tsotne Rogava || Tatneft Arena World Cup 2012 1/2 final (+91 kg) || Kazan, Russia || Decision (unanimous) || 4 || 3:00
|- style="background:#cfc;"
| 2012-06-30 || Win ||align=left| Pacôme Assi || Pro Fight Karaté 4, Final  || Levallois-Perret, France || Decision || 3 || 3:00
|-
! style="background:white" colspan=9 | 
|- style="background:#cfc;"
| 2012-06-30 || Win ||align=left| Corentin Jallon || Pro Fight Karaté 4, Semi Finals || Levallois-Perret, France || Decision || 3 || 3:00
|- style="background:#fbb;"
| 2012-05-12 || Loss ||align=left| Abdarhmane Coulibaly || Wicked One Tournament  || Paris, France || TKO (strikes) || 2 || N/A
|- style="background:#cfc;"
| 2012-04-28 || Win ||align=left| Andrei Chekhonin || Tatneft Arena World Cup 2012 1st selection 1/4 final (+91 kg) || Kazan, Russia || Decision (unanimous) || 4 || 3:00
|- style="background:#fbb;"
| 2012-03-03 || Loss ||align=left| Alexei Papin || Martial Arts Festival "For Russia" - 2 || Chelyabinsk, Russia || KO (strikes) || 4 || N/A
|- style="background:#cfc;"
| 2012-04-28 || Win ||align=left| Ivan Bartek || Tatneft Arena World Cup 2012 1st selection 1/8 final (+91 kg) || Kazan, Russia || TKO (3 knockdowns) || 1 || N/A
|- style="background:#cfc;"
| 2012-02-11 || Win ||align=left| Vladimir Toktasynov || Emperor Chok Dee  || France || TKO (strikes) || N/A || N/A
|- style="background:#cfc;"
| 2011-12-07 || Win ||align=left| Patrick Liedert || A-1 World Combat Cup  || Lyon, France || Decision || N/A || N/A
|- style="background:#fbb;"
| 2011-11-19 || Loss ||align=left| Brice Guidon || Time Fight || Tours, France || Decision (unanimous) || 3 || 3:00
|- style="background:#fbb;"
| 2011-03-19 || Loss ||align=left| Errol Zimmerman || United Glory 13: 2010-2011 World Series Semifinals || Charleroi, Belgium || TKO (referee stoppage) || 1 || 0:33
|- style="background:#cfc;"
| 2011-02-12 || Win ||align=left| Frédéric Sinistra || Les Rois du Ring 3  || Meurthe et Moselle, France || KO (strikes) || N/A || N/A
|- style="background:#fbb;"
| 2011-01-07 || Loss ||align=left| Lorenzo Javier Jorge || Fight in Spirit  || Epernay, France || Decision || 3 || 3:00
|- style="background:#fbb;"
| 2010-11-19 || Loss ||align=left| Abdarhmane Coulibaly || Fight For Peace, Final || France || TKO (strikes) || 2 || N/A
|-
! style="background:white" colspan=9 |
|- style="background:#cfc;"
| 2010-11-19 || Win ||align=left| Musap Gulsari || Fight For Peace, Semi Finals || France || TKO (strikes) || 3 || N/A
|- style="background:#cfc;"
| 2010–06-04 || Win ||align=left| Hicham Tourar || Nitrianska Noc Bojovnikov - Ring of Honor || Nitra, Slovakia || Decision || 3 || 3:00
|- style="background:#fbb;"
| 2010-02-06 || Loss ||align=left| Stéphane Susperregui || Gala de Saumur  ||France || TKO (strikes) || 3 || N/A
|- style="background:#fbb;"
| 2009-05-03 || Loss ||align=left| Brice Guidon || Nuit des Sports de Combat ||Geneva, Switzerland || Decision (unanimous) || 3 || 3:00
|- style="background:#cfc;"
| 2009 || Win ||align=left| Redouan Cairo ||  || Contrexéville, France || N/A || N/A || N/A
|-
! style="background:white" colspan=9 | 
|- style="background:#cfc;"
| 2008-12-12 || Win ||align=left| Gordan Jukić || Splendid Grad Prix 2  || Budva, Montenegro || KO (strikes) || 2 || N/A
|-
! style="background:white" colspan=9 | 
|- style="background:#fbb;"
| 2008-05-11 || Loss ||align=left| Gordan Jukić || Obračun u Ringu 8 || Zadar, Croatia || TKO (strikes) || 4 || N/A
|-
! style="background:white" colspan=9 | 
|- style="background:#fbb;"
| 2007-11-18 || Loss ||align=left| Adnan Redžović || WFC 3: Bad Sunday || Domžale, Slovenia || Ext R. Decision (unanimous)|| 4 || 3:00
|- style="background:#fbb;"
| 2006-09-16 || Loss ||align=left| Mohamed Oudriss || Fight Night Mannheim || Mannheim, Germany || N/A || N/A || N/A
|- style="background:#fbb;"
| 2006-08-18 || Loss ||align=left| Marko Tomasović || K-1 Hungary 2006, Semi Finals || Debrecen, Hungary || N/A || N/A || N/A
|- style="background:#cfc;"
| 2006-08-18 || Win ||align=left| Tihamer Brunner || K-1 Hungary 2006, Quarter Finals || Debrecen, Hungary || N/A || N/A || N/A
|-
| colspan=8 |
Legend: 

|}

See also
List of male kickboxers

References

External links
Profile at fightlife.ru

1986 births
Living people
French male kickboxers
Algerian male kickboxers
French sportspeople of Algerian descent
Algerian expatriates in France
Sportspeople from Oran
Glory kickboxers
SUPERKOMBAT kickboxers